Centauropyge is a trilobite in the order Phacopida that existed during the lower Devonian in what is now Turkey. It was described by Haas in 1968, and the type species is Centauropyge pronomaea. It was described from the Gebze Formation.

References

External links
 Centauropyge at the Paleobiology Database

Fossils of Turkey
Acastidae
Fossil taxa described in 1968